The Sisterhood of the Traveling Pants is an American comedy-drama film series, based on the book series of the same name by Ann Brashares.

Films

The Sisterhood of the Traveling Pants (2005)

Four best girlfriends hatch a plan to stay connected with one another as their lives start off in different directions: they pass around a pair of secondhand jeans that fits each of their bodies perfectly.

The Sisterhood of the Traveling Pants 2 (2008)

Four college freshmen and best friends find that it may take more than a shared pair of jeans to help them stay in touch as their lives go in different directions.

Future
A third film was announced to be in the works in 2014. It would be based on the book Sisterhood Everlasting, and produced by Alloy Entertainment. Liz W. Garcia was tapped to write a screenplay and Ken Kwapis, director of the first film, would be directing this installment. In April 2018, Bledel had revealed that the film had recently been pitched. In October 2022, Tamblyn stated that family life was one of the roadblocks to the film getting made.

Musical
A musical adaptation based on the 2005 film is in development.

Cast
 A  indicates the actor portrayed the role of a younger version of the character.
 A  indicates a cameo appearance.
 A dark gray cell indicates the character was not in the film.

Crew

Reception

Box office performance

Critical and public response

References

External links
 
 

Warner Bros. Pictures franchises
Film series introduced in 2005
American film series